MLR may refer to:

People 
 Mary Lynn Rajskub, actress

Places
 MLR Institute of Technology
 Mar-Lu-Ridge Summer Camp and Education and Conference Center
 Milnrow railway station, England, UK; National Rail station code MLR

Finance 
 Medical Loss Ratio, in health insurance
 Minimum lending rate
 Monotone likelihood ratio
 Money laundering regulations

Literature
 Michigan Law Review
 Minnesota Law Review
 Modern Language Review
 Modern Law Review
 Monthly Labor Review, a monthly journal published by the U.S. Bureau of Labor Statistics

Science and technology
 Multiple linear regression – see Linear regression
 Morse/Long-range potential
 Machine-learned ranking
 Machine Learning Runtime, a machine learning environment in Databricks (software)
 Mineralocorticoid receptor
 Mixed lymphocyte reaction
 Mesencephalic locomotor region, a region in the brainstem comprising the pedunculopontine nucleus, the cuneiform nucleus and the subcuneiform nucleus

Organizations
 Major League Rugby, the professional rugby union competition of North America.
 Ministry of Land and Resources

Transport
 Metro Light Rail, the light rail in Sydney (2000–2012)
 Valley Metro Rail, the light rail network in Phoenix, Arizona
 Mid-life Refurbishment, another term for MTR MLR Train EMU

Weapons and military
 Main Line of Resistance
 Muzzle-loading rifle
 Multiple rocket launcher

Sport 
 Major League Rugby, a professional rugby competition in the United States and Canada

Other 
 Montana Land Reliance
 Metadata for learning resources or ISO/IEC 19788, a standard to describe learning resources

See also